The 1912 Miami Redskins football team was an American football team that represented Miami Universityas a member of the Ohio Athletic Conference (OAC) during the 1912 college football season. Led by coach James C. Donnelly in his first year, Miami compiled a 3–3–2 record.  Donnelly was acting professor of physical education at the school.

Schedule

References

Miami
Miami RedHawks football seasons
Miami Redskins football